Kraftwerk is the debut studio album by German electronic band Kraftwerk. It was released in Germany in 1970, and produced by Konrad "Conny" Plank.

Recording
The album was recorded from July to September 1970. Chief Kraftwerk members Ralf Hütter and Florian Schneider used two drummers during the recording of the album; Andreas Hohmann and Klaus Dinger. Dinger played on "Vom Himmel Hoch", while Hohmann played on "Ruckzuck", and "Stratovarius", however these last ones were completed before Dinger joined the sessions.

The other instrumentation features Hütter on bass and Hammond and Tubon electric organs, the latter was made by Swedish factory Joh Mustad AB in 1966, whilst Schneider supplied flute. The song "Ruckzuck" is driven by a powerful multi-dubbed flute riff, along with electric violin and guitar; these instruments often connected to further electronics via an Electronic Music Studios pitch-to-voltage converter. "Vom Himmel Hoch" has slight pitch curves that emulate Doppler effect. The artwork featured a fluorescent-coloured traffic cone drawn.

Release
Kraftwerk was released in November 1970. In early 1971, Hutter left the group and Schneider was left alone with drummer Dinger and newcomer guitarist Michael Rother. The 3-member Kraftwerk line up of Schneider, Dinger and Michael Rother made an appearance on Radio Bremen, and also on the TV shows Beat-Club and Okidoki. After this, Dinger and Rother left to form revered band Neu!, with Hütter rejoining Schneider to continue Kraftwerk and both parties recording under the mentoring of Conny Plank.

No material from this album has been performed in the band's live set since the Autobahn tour of 1975 and, to date, the album has not been officially reissued on compact disc. The band is seemingly reluctant to consider the album a part of its canon and in later interviews, Schneider referred to the first three Kraftwerk albums as "archaeology". However, unlicensed CD and vinyl pressings of the album have been widely available since the mid-1990s on the Germanofon and Crown labels. Kraftwerk has hinted that the album may finally see a re-mastered CD release after its Der Katalog boxed set.

Use in medias 
"Ruckzuck" was used as the theme song for the PBS show Newton's Apple in the United States.

Track listing

Personnel
Adapted from liner notes:

Kraftwerk
 Ralf Hütter – organ, guitar, tubon, cover design
 Florian Schneider-Esleben – flute, violin, percussion
 Andreas Hohmann – drums on "Ruckzuck" and "Stratovarius"
 Klaus Dinger – drums on "Vom Himmel Hoch"

Additional personnel
 Konrad "Conny" Plank – sound engineer & production
 Klaus Löhmer – assistant sound engineer

Charts

Weekly charts

Year-end charts

References

Bibliography

External links
 Kraftwerk official – Free Listening on SoundCloud
 

Kraftwerk albums
1970 debut albums
Albums produced by Conny Plank
Philips Records albums
Vertigo Records albums
Albums produced by Ralf Hütter
Albums produced by Florian Schneider